This article is a summary of 2000 in Norwegian football.

The 2000-season is the 95. season of competitive football in Norway.

Men's football

League season

Tippeligaen

1. divisjon

2. divisjon

3. divisjon

Norwegian Cup

Final

Women's football

League season

Toppserien

Norwegian Women's Cup

Final
Asker 4–1 Bjørnar

National teams

Norway men's national football team

UEFA Euro 2000

2002 FIFA World Cup qualification (UEFA)

Group 5

Fixtures and results

Key
 H = Home match
 A = Away match
 N = Neutral ground

Norway women's national football team

Notes and references

 
Seasons in Norwegian football